Cychrus liei is a species of ground beetle in the subfamily of Carabinae. It was described by Klienfeld in 2003.

References

liei
Beetles described in 2003